Jake Kaminski (born August 11, 1988) is an American archer.

Personal life
Kaminski was born in Buffalo, New York and grew up in Elma, New York. As of August 2016, he resides in Gainesville, Florida with his wife Heather and children Kai and Genevieve. When not at home, he has resided in Chula Vista, California at the U.S. Olympic Training Center since 2006 to develop his archery skills.

Archery career
Kaminski started his archery career at the age of six near his hometown of Elma, New York, focusing on compound shooting at a Junior Olympic Development Club. By the age of 15, he focused his attention on recurve archery so he could one day compete in the Olympics. At the 2012 Summer Olympics he competed for the U.S. in the Men's team event and won a silver Olympic medal along with his teammates Brady Ellison and Jacob Wukie. At the 2016 Summer Olympics, he once again competed for the United States in the Men's team event and took home another silver Olympic medal, alongside teammates Brady Ellison and Zach Garrett.

References

External links

 

1988 births
Sportspeople from Buffalo, New York
American male archers
Archers at the 2012 Summer Olympics
Archers at the 2016 Summer Olympics
Olympic silver medalists for the United States in archery
Medalists at the 2012 Summer Olympics
Medalists at the 2016 Summer Olympics
Archers at the 2011 Pan American Games
World Archery Championships medalists
Pan American Games gold medalists for the United States
Pan American Games medalists in archery
Living people
Medalists at the 2011 Pan American Games